Olof Olsson (1872–1939) was a Swedish Social Democratic politician. He served as minister of education and ecclesiastical affairs during several periods (1919–1920, 1921–1923 and 1924–1926).

He was the father of cartoonist and journalist Jan-Erik Garland.

References 

1872 births
1939 deaths
Swedish Social Democratic Party politicians
Swedish Ministers of Education and Ecclesiastical Affairs